State elections were held in South Australia on 27 May 1905. All 42 seats in the South Australian House of Assembly were up for election. The incumbent conservative government led by Premier of South Australia Richard Butler in an informal coalition with the liberals was defeated by the United Labor Party (ULP) led by Leader of the Opposition Thomas Price. Each of the 13 districts elected multiple members, with voters casting multiple votes.

The first ministry formed after the 1902 election by John Jenkins, who resigned prior to the 1905 election. Richard Butler took the parliament into the 1905 election. Prior to the election, a new party formed. The rural stockowners and graziers were concerned at the concentration of the Australasian National League (ANL) on the metropolitan electorates and urban issues. In 1905, these interests formed the Farmers and Producers Political Union (FPPU), which had a conservative political agenda, and was absolutely opposed to franchise reform. It was essentially the rural wing of the ANL. There were four distinct blocs at the election, with the over-riding issue that of franchise reform for the Legislative Council: the ULP, a liberal group of franchise reformers led by Archibald Peake, the Butler moderate
conservatives with some FPPU support, and an "extreme conservative" group led by John Darling at the core of the ANL. There was no "Liberal" party, but there was a relatively cohesive liberal group among both independent members and candidates. The Liberal and Democratic Union would not be formed until the 1906 election.

The ULP, on the fewest seats prior to the election, in just one election became the single largest party, increasing their primary vote to 41.3 (+22.2) percent and increasing their representation from five to 15 seats, winning 11 of the 12 city seats (four at the last election) from the three city multi-member electorates, Adelaide, Port Adelaide and Torrens, with a policy of development and progress, expansion of business and honest government: "they would not be frightened by the nonsense that had been talked about socialism". After the new lower house first met, the ULP forced the incumbent conservative Butler government to resign with the support of several disaffected non-ULP MPs, forming the Price-Peake administration minority government. Peake sought the alliance stating "the only difference between us is a difference of degree and of speed". It was the start of the first stable Labor government in the world. A year later at the 1906 election, the ULP would increase their primary vote to 44.8 (+3.5) percent and increase their representation from 15 to 20 seats, just two short of a parliamentary majority.

See also
Members of the South Australian House of Assembly, 1905-1906
Members of the South Australian Legislative Council, 1905–1908

References
History of South Australian elections 1857-2006, volume 1: ECSA
Statistical Record of the Legislature 1836-2007: SA Parliament
State and federal election results in Australia since 1890

External links
The 13 electorates from 1902 to 1915: The Adelaide Chronicle

Elections in South Australia
1905 elections in Australia
1900s in South Australia
May 1905 events